Tuoba Chuo (pinyin: Tuòbá Chuò) (died 293), chieftain of the Tuoba from 286 to 293. He was the son of Tuoba Liwei, brother of Tuoba Shamohan, Tuoba Xilu, Tuoba Luguan. In 286 he succeeded his brother Tuoba Xilu as chieftain of the Tuoba. In 293, Yuwen chieftain Yuwen Mohuai was killed by his younger brother Yuwen Pubo, who usurped the position as chieftain of the Yuwen. Tuoba Chuo married his daughter to Yuwen Pubo's son Yuwen Qiubuqin. In the same year Tuoba Chuo died, his nephew Tuoba Fu, son of his brother Tuoba Shamohan, succeeded him as chieftain of the Tuoba.

References 
 History of the Northern Dynasties

293 deaths
Year of birth unknown
Chieftains of the Tuoba clan